"Stay for Awhile" is a 1986 single by Christian singer Amy Grant, and was the first single from her album The Collection.  Background vocals were provided by herself and her friend, Richard Page, lead singer for Mr. Mister at the time.

Background
Throughout 1985 and 1986, Amy Grant was busy touring and promoting her successful pop-crossover album Unguarded. Previously she had been solely a CCM artist, but with the release of her single "Find a Way", she established herself as a credible name in mainstream music.

Despite her success, she was also suffering personal problems. Her husband, Gary Chapman, had become addicted to cocaine, and she spent most of early 1986 trying to deal with the problem. Even though she hardly had time for new recordings, she did manage to release the No. 1 pop single "The Next Time I Fall," which was a duet with Peter Cetera, and her record company issued a best-of compilation that covered her first ten years in the music industry.

Personnel

 Amy Grant – lead and backing vocals
 Dann Huff – guitar
 Nathan East – bass
 Paul Leim – drums
 Paulinho Da Costa – percussion
 David Gamson - keyboards
 Michael W. Smith – keyboards
 Shane Keister – keyboards
 Robbie Buchanan – keyboards
 Steve Schaffer – Synclavier programming
 Richard Page – backing vocals

Track listing
Remixes (featuring Tony Moran) - EP
Stay for Awhile (featuring Tony Moran) [Destination Radio Mix] - 3:38
Stay for Awhile (featuring Tony Moran) [Destination Mixshow Edit] - 6:38
Stay for Awhile (featuring Tony Moran) [Destination Club Anthem Remix] - 8:52
Stay for Awhile (featuring Tony Moran & Warren Rigg) [Radio Mix] - 4:08
Stay for Awhile (featuring Tony Moran & Warren Rigg) [Club Mix] - 9:00

Official versions
 Album version - 5:37
 Edited version - 3:43
 Promo version - 4:22
 Tony Moran & Warren Rigg club mix - 5:39
 Tony Moran & Warren Rigg radio edit - 4:08 
 Tony Moran Destination Club anthem remix - 9:00
 Tony Moran Destination mixshow edit - 6:45
 Tony Moran Destination radio mix - 3:37

Chart Success
In June 1986, The Collection was released in two separate LP and cassette versions, and "Stay for Awhile" was issued as its first single. Although there was a lack of promotion for both the album and the single, The Collection managed to top the Inspirational chart and "Stay for Awhile" topped the Christian radio chart and made the Top Twenty of the Adult Contemporary chart. "Stay for Awhile" paved the road to further pop radio success for Grant. Her next single, "The Next Time I Fall" became her first No. 1 pop song (following a long line of No. 1 songs on the Christian Music charts).

Charts

Accolades
GMA Dove Awards

Amy Grant songs
1986 singles
Songs written by Wayne Kirkpatrick
Songs written by Amy Grant